Crown Electric is Kathryn Williams 11th album, released by One Little Indian on 30 September 2013. Its title refers to the Memphis power company that Elvis Presley was employed by during his pre fame years and features in that album track "Gave It Away" "Elvis drove trucks for Crown Electric before he was The King". The Metro newspaper dubbed the album 'Magnificent and melancholic  with Clash magazine suggesting the album added "a new dimension to her sound"

Track listing 
 Underground 3:42    
 Gave It Away 3:22    
 Heart Shaped Stone 3:38    
 Count 3:32    
 Out Of Time 3:34    
 Monday Morning 3:37    
 Darkness Light 3:40    
 Picture Book 4:52    
 Morning Twilight 3:18    
 Arwen 3:37    
 Tequila 4:46    
 Sequins 3:43    
 The Known 2:58

Personnel 
Kathryn Williams - guitar / vocals
Neill MacColl - guitars / keyboards / backing vocals
Jon Thorne - Double bass
Luke Flowers - Drums
Ben Trigg - Cello
Jonny Enright - Trombone
Ed Harcourt - piano on 'Darkness Light', 'Morning Twilight' & 'Sequins' & vocals on 'Morning Twilight'
James Yorkston - backing vocals on 'Arwen'
Chris Sheehan - backing vocals and guitar on 'Arwen'
Andy Bruce - backing vocals and guitar on 'Tequila' & 'backing vocals on 'Arwen'
Andy Nunn - electric piano and Hammond organ on 'The Known'

Recording 
Produced By Neill MacColl

Recorded at Bryn Derwen Studios, Konk Studios, 50:50 Studios, The Cave & Ed's living room

Engineered  & mixed by David Wrench

References 

2013 albums
Kathryn Williams albums
Music in Newcastle upon Tyne
One Little Independent Records albums